Governor Hope may refer to:

Arthur Hope, 2nd Baron Rankeillour (1897–1958), Governor of Madras Presidency from 1940 to 1946
John Bruce Hope (1680s–1766), Governor of Bermuda from 1721 to 1727
Victor Hope, 2nd Marquess of Linlithgow (1887–1952), Governor-General and Viceroy of India from 1936 to 1943